German Texans have historically played a role in history of the U.S. state of Texas.

Texans of German birth or descent have, since the mid-19th century, made up one of the largest ethnic groups in the state. By 1850, they numbered 5% of the total population—a conservative count. The 1990 census listed more than 17% of the population, nearly three million individuals, claiming German heritage.

Notable German Texans

Prince Carl of Solms-Braunfels
Katherine Center
Edward Degener
Friedrich Diercks (or Johann Friedrich Ernst)
Dr. Carl Adolph Douai
Dwight D. Eisenhower
Henry Francis Fisher
O. C. Fisher
John Frels
William Frels
Justin Furstenfeld
Summer Glau
Phil Hardberger
Laura Harring
Ferdinand Ludwig Herff
Betty Holekamp
Engelbert Krauskopf
Pastor John Kilian
Ralph Kirshbaum
Louis Kleberg
Robert J. Kleberg
Bob Krueger
Jacob Kuechler
Ferdinand Lindheimer
Tom Loeffler
Hermann Lungkwitz
Charles W. Machemehl
Chuck Machemehl
Johann Machemehl
Louis A. Machemehl
Paul Machemehl
John O. Meusebach (or Baron Ottfried Hans Freiherr von Meusebach)
Burchard Miller
Gus Franklin Mutscher
Randy Neugebauer
Elisabet Ney
Chester W. Nimitz
Bonnie Parker
Friedrich Richard Petri
Robert Rauschenberg
Bob Schieffer
Gustav Schleicher
Kevin Schwantz
Zachary Selig
Kel Seliger
August Siemering
Hermann Spiess
Nick Stahl
Friedrich Armand Strubberg
Johann Ludwig Karl Heinrich von Struve
Count Ludwig Joseph von Boos-Waldeck
Ferdinand von Roemer
Arlene Wohlgemuth
Harry M. Wurzbach

See also

 German American
 German Americans in the American Civil War
 List of people from Texas
 List of German Americans
 Nueces massacre

External links
German Texan Heritage Society
German Texans

History of Central Texas Germans
Notable Central Texas Germans
Hill Country Germans

Texans
German Texans
German Texans
German